Object-oriented or object-orientation is a software engineering concept, in which concepts are represented as "objects". Object-oriented topics include:

 Object-oriented analysis and design
 Object-oriented design
 Object-oriented database
 Object-oriented modeling
 Object-oriented operating system
 Object-oriented programming
 Object-oriented user interface